Hypoponera opaciceps is a species of ant in the family Formicidae.

Subspecies
These seven subspecies belong to the species Hypoponera opaciceps:
 Hypoponera opaciceps cubana (Santschi, 1930) i c
 Hypoponera opaciceps gaigei (Forel, 1914) i c g
 Hypoponera opaciceps gibbinota (Forel, 1912) i c
 Hypoponera opaciceps jamaicensis (Aguayo, 1932) i c g
 Hypoponera opaciceps opaciceps (Mayr, 1887) i c g
 Hypoponera opaciceps pampana (Santschi, 1925) i c
 Hypoponera opaciceps postangustata (Forel, 1908) i c g
Data sources: i = ITIS, c = Catalogue of Life, g = GBIF, b = Bugguide.net

References

Further reading

External links

 

Ponerinae
Articles created by Qbugbot
Insects described in 1887